Death of a Nation: The Timor Conspiracy is a 1994 Central Independent Television documentary, written and presented by  John Pilger, and directed and produced by David Munro, which documents the involvement of Western governments in the occupation of East Timor in the context of the 1990-91 Gulf War. "Accusations of genocide fly in this disturbing and controversial British documentary," writes Sandra Brennan of Allmovie, as well as, "disturbing accusations regarding the complacency of the U.S., British, and Australian governments who purportedly knew about the killing and did nothing." An updated version of the film entitled The Timor Conspiracy was released in 1999.

Participants
 Alan Clark - former British Defence Minister
 James Dunn - former Australian consul in East Timor
 Gareth Evans - Australian Foreign Affairs Minister
 Abel Guterres - Timorese exile
 José Ramos Horta - Timorese Foreign Minister, in exile
 C. Philip Liechty - senior CIA officer in Indonesia
 Konis Santana - Commander, Timorese resistance
 Shirley Shackleton - wife of murdered reporter
 Mário Soares - President of Portugal
 Sir Alan Thomas - head, British Defence Sales
 Nugroho Wisnumurti - Indonesian ambassador to UN
 Richard Woolcott - former Australian ambassador to Indonesia

Awards
 1994 Amsterdam International Documentary Film Festival Zapper Award: David Munro (Won)

References

External links

1994 television specials
British television documentaries
Documentary films presented by John Pilger
1994 films
1990s English-language films
1990s British films